The 1961 edition of the Campeonato Carioca kicked off on July 30, 1961 and ended on December 28, 1961. It was organized by FCF (Federação Carioca de Futebol, or Carioca Football Federation). Twelve teams participated. Botafogo won the title for the 11th time. no teams were relegated.

System
The tournament would be divided in two stages:
 First round: The twelve teams all played against each other in a single round-robin format. The eight best teams qualified to the Second round.
 Second round: The remaining eight teams all played in a double round-robin format against each other. The team with the most points in the sum of both stages won the title.

Championship

First round

Second round

Final standings

References

Campeonato Carioca seasons
Carioca